Nebojša Ćirić is the former Minister of Economy and Regional Development in the Government of the Republic of Serbia. He is a member of the G17 Plus political party.

He was born in 1974 in Bor. He graduated from the University of Belgrade Faculty of Economics.

From 1996 to 1997 he was a Junior Account Manager at the Belgrade Ogilvy & Mather. Between 1997 and 2001 he was an expert consultant at the Economy Institute in Belgrade. In 2001-2002 he was a special adviser for foreign investments to the Ministry for Foreign Economic Relations, under the Government of Zoran Đinđić. In 2002-2007 he was the CEO for financial consulting in Deloitte & Touche. In 2007-2008 he was an assistant assigned for Economic Affairs and Privatization in the Ministry of Economy and Regional Development during Vojislav Koštunica's second term in office. From July 2008 to May 2011 he was the State Secretary in the Ministry of Economy and Regional Development; during the major governmental restructuring after the political clash between G17 Plus and the Democratic Party, he was promoted to and replaced Mlađan Dinkić as Minister of Economy and Regional Development, serving that position ever since.

He speaks English.

References

External links
 Official biography

1974 births
Living people
G17 Plus politicians
Government ministers of Serbia
University of Belgrade Faculty of Economics alumni